Olga Lehmann (10 February 1912 – 26 October 2001) was a Chilean-born British visual artist.

Early life

Born in Catemu, Chile, to Mary Grisel Lehmann (née Bissett) and mining engineer Andrew William Lehmann, Olga Lehmann had one sister, Monica (Monica Pidgeon), and one brother, George (Andrew George Lehmann). Her father was of German and French descent (born in Paris) and her mother was Scottish. She was educated at Santiago College, and in 1929 moved to England, where she was awarded a scholarship to the Slade School of Fine Art, London University.

At the Slade she studied fine art under the tutelage of Henry Tonks and Randolph Schwabe, specializing in theatrical design under Vladimir Polunin and in portraiture under Allan Gwynne-Jones. Awarded prizes in life painting, composition, and theatrical design, she visited Spain in the early thirties; Spanish and Moorish themes were subsequently reflected in her art.

Career

Her productive working life as an artist spanned almost six decades, from the 1930s to the 1980s. Throughout the 1930s she acquired a reputation in the fields of mural painting and portraiture. She exhibited her work at the Royal Society of Portrait Painters in 1933, and with the London Group in 1935. Later sitters of note consisted of people associated with the film or record industries such as singers Edric Connor, Carmen Prietto, conductor Richard Austin, and actors Dirk Bogarde and Patrice Wymore. During the Blitz in 1940, her studio-flat in Hampstead was destroyed by a bomb, and much of her early work was lost.

After World War II, her name chiefly became associated with graphic design for the Radio Times, and designing for the film and television industries. In 1939 she married author and editor Edward Richard Carl Huson, by whom she had one son, author and television writer and producer Paul Huson. She was predeceased by her husband in 1984, and she herself died in Saffron Walden, Essex, in 2001.

Works

Illustration, design, and graphic work

In 1936 Lehmann executed black and white designs for Pilkington Glass Ltd., and designed wallpapers for John Line, Ltd.
In 1937 she illustrated the book Weekend Caravan, edited by S. Hillelson.
In 1938 she illustrated the book Happy Heart, Some frontier folk I have met, fish, flesh and fowl, by Cora L. Shearburn.
In 1940 Lehmann was permitted by the War Office to make sketches and drawings of London bomb damage, air raid shelters, and Air Raid Precautions personnel.
In 1941, Lehmann began drawing monthly illustrations for the British Broadcasting Corporation's publication the Radio Times, commissions that would last over a period of almost two decades.
Lehmann also started drawing illustrations for another BBC publication, The Listener, beginning with Louis Macneice's Cook's Tour of the London Subways. In 1941, Lehmann also illustrated the novel Look! The Wild Swans, by Juliette de Baïracli Levy (pictorial title page, frontis, six full-page and one half-page illustrations in black and white, pictorial card cover). She later illustrated a book of poetry by Levy, The Yew Wreath, (eight full-page black and white illustrations, pictorial card cover), and a second novel of Levy's, The Bride of Llew, (black and white illustrations, pictorial card cover).
In 1942 Lehmann joined the London artists' agency R. P. Gossop, for illustration commissions.
In 1946 Lehmann illustrated Fairy Tales from Turkey, collected by Naki Tezel, trans. Margery Kent, ed. Herbert Read (color frontis., seven full-page black and white illustrations).
In 1947 Lehmann illustrated A Youthful Poet's Dream (black and white vertical half-page in The Children's Own Treasure Book, Odhams Press).
In between 1948-1950 Lehmann also began drawing periodic illustrations for BBC Publications, the Arabic Listener.
In 1948 she illustrated An Indian Boyhood by Noel Sircar, London: Hollis & Carter (21 chapter-head illustrations in black and white scraperboard, pictorial dust jacket); The Peddler (black and white pictorial border) in The Modern Gift Book for Children, Odhams Press; "How Dan met the Fairies of Elbolton" (full-page color, pictorial border to title and two text illustrations) in "The Children's Hour Annual", Odhams Press.
In 1949 Lehmann illustrated the book jacket for Dead Lion by John and Emery Bonnett (Michael Joseph, London).
In 1950 Lehmann executed illustrations for a year's advertising campaign for Murphy Radio Ltd. She also drew illustrations for The London Mystery Magazine, vol 1, number 2, The Trod, by Algernon Blackwood; and numbers 3, 4, 5, 6, The Slave Detective by Wallace Nichols.
In 1952, she illustrated Singing Together – Rhythm and Melody, for BBC Publications.
Lehmann also illustrated the cover for the Christmas issue of London Calling, the overseas journal of the BBC.
She also drew the illustrations and designed the dust jacket for Evening Star, by M.E. Patchett, Lutterworth Press.
Lehmann illustrated the 1953 London Calling, Christmas Issue cover.
1954–1957: Lehmann designed record sleeves for Argo Records (UK).
1954, Lehmann again illustrated the London Calling Christmas Issue cover.
1985: Lehmann illustrated and published The Wishing Chair and Other Verse, by her late husband, Carl Huson.
1986: Lehmann illustrated and published Spoken Words: World War II Poems, Tales & Memories, by Carl Huson.
1987: Lehmann illustrated and published Fine Feathers, a book of poems for children, by Carl Huson.

Murals

In 1934 Olga Lehmann was commissioned by a French company, Stic-B Paints, Ltd, to paint murals in the Palace Hotel, Buxton.
In 1935 Lehmann painted murals in the St. Helier House Hotel, Jersey. She was chosen to design a canvas mural for the Queen Victoria Street Railway Bridge, London, to celebrate the Royal Silver Jubilee of King George V and Queen Mary.
Between 1936 and 1938 Lehmann painted murals for architect Clive Entwistle, and received multiple commissions from .Stic-B Paints for murals in hotels, private buildings, shops and nurseries. In 1938 she exhibited mural designs at the Building Centre, Bond Street. London, with Mary Adshead, Aelred Bartlett, John Hutton, Roland Pym and Laurence Scarfe, and painted murals in Fuller's Restaurant, Sloane Street in 1939, just before the outbreak of World War II.
In 1940 Lehmann painted murals for London Air Raid Precautions Headquarters, and received a permit from the War Office to execute sketches and drawings of London bomb damage, air raid shelters, and ARP personnel. In 1942 she painted murals at the Censorship Department, Holborn.
1943: Lehmann designed and painted murals for the workers' canteen in Bristol Aircraft Company's underground, wartime factory in Spring Quarry, Corsham. These are now part of MoD Corsham, and are grade II* listed. She also designed and painted murals in the Pavilion Hotel, Scarborough, and the Grand Hotel, Brighton, by which time she had entered the British film industry.
In 1953 Lehmann painted a mural on canvas featuring Captain Bligh for Errol Flynn's Tichfield Hotel in Port Antonio, Jamaica.

Film, television, and theatrical design

In 1941, Lehmann painted murals for the film Hi Gang! at Gainsborough Studios, Islington, and for the film Much Too Shy. She also joined the Association of Cine-Technicians union as a member of the Scenic Artists division, and painted scenery and mural decorations at Gaumont British Studios, Riverside Studios, Metro-Goldwyn-Mayer studios, and British National Studios.
In 1943 she painted mural decorations for the film He Snoops to Conquer.
In 1944 Lehmann joined the art department of British National Studios as a scenic artist. She painted mural decorations for the film Waltz Time.
1945: Lehmann painted mural decorations for the film Latin Quarter.
1946–1954: Lehmann was contracted to Associated British Picture Corporation, painting murals, scenery, portraits of contract stars; drawing continuity sketches and production designs.
1946: Lehmann executed paintings for the film The Ghosts of Berkeley Square.
1947: Lehmann painted portraits for the film No Room at the Inn, murals for the film Counterblast, and portraits and murals for the film The Three Weird Sisters.
1948: Lehmann painted mural decorations for the film Private Angelo.
1949: Lehmann painted portraits of Marlene Dietrich for Alfred Hitchcock's Stage Fright.
1950: Lehmann designed the opening credits and painted the portrait of Hugh Griffith for the film Laughter in Paradise.
1951: Lehmann painted scenic decoration on the film The Master of Ballentrae.
1954: Lehmann executed the storyboard and several costume designs for the film The Dark Avenger. She also did scenic decoration on the film Oh, Rosalinda!
1955: Lehmann painted the portraits and drew the storyboard for the London sequence of the film based on Jules Verne's novel, Michael Todd's Around the World in 80 Days. She also designed credit titles for the film Safari. She painted the portrait of Terry Moore for the film Portrait of Alison, and designed costumes for the films The Big Money and Gamma People.
1956: Lehmann devised and designed Vera-Ellen's ballet for Marcel Helman's film Let's be Happy. She also designed the costumes for the film Robbery under Arms.
1957: Lehmann designed the costumes and credit titles for George Pal's film The Adventures of Tom Thumb, and drew the storyboard for the film Inn of the Sixth Happiness.
1958: Lehmann designed the costumes for Robert Hamer's film The Scapegoat. She also drew the storyboard for Nicholas Ray's film The Savage Innocents.
1959: Lehmann drew the storyboard for Vincente Minnelli's film The Four Horsemen of the Apocalypse. She also painted portraits of Peter Sellers for Anthony Asquith's film The Millionairess.
1960: Lehmann became Film Art Director for the London advertising agency Mather & Crowther for two years. She also designed the costumes for Carl Foreman's film The Guns of Navarone, and costumes for the Girl Guides of Great Britain 25th Jubilee pageant .
1962: Lehmann formed Olga Lehmann Associates, and took the post of Production Designer for Rank Advertising Films, a position she held for over ten years. She also designed the costumes for Carl Foreman's film' 'The Victors.
1966: Lehmann designed costumes for Tippi Hedren in Charlie Chaplin's film A Countess from Hong Kong.
1968: Lehmann designed costumes for the film Captain Nemo and the Underwater City.
1970: Lehmann designed costumes for the Delbert Mann's film Kidnapped.
1976: Lehmann designed costumes and painted a portrait for William Bast's adaptation for television of Dumas's The Man in the Iron Mask, produced by Norman Rosemont. She also designed costumes and painted a portrait for Rosemont's television film The Four Feathers.
1977: Lehmann received an Emmy nomination for outstanding costume design on The Man in the Iron Mask. She designed the costumes for Rosemont's television film Les Misérables.
1978: Lehmann received an Emmy nomination for outstanding costume design on The Four Feathers.
1979: Lehmann designed the costumes for Rosemont's television films Little Lord Fauntleroy and A Tale of Two Cities.
1981: Lehmann received an Emmy nomination for outstanding costume design on A Tale of Two Cities. Lehmann designed costumes for Rosemont's television films Ivanhoe and Witness for the Prosecution.
1983: Lehmann designed costumes and painted a portrait for William Bast's television adaptation of R. L. Stevenson's The Master of Ballantrae and for William Bast's television film The First Olympics: Athens 1896, both produced by Larry White.
1984: Lehmann received an Emmy nomination for outstanding costume design on The Master of Ballantrae.
1985: Lehmann painted portraits of Barbara Stanwyck, Charlton Heston and Stephanie Beacham for the Spelling/Shapiro/Cramer ABC television series The Colbys.

Exhibitions

One-woman

The AIA Gallery, London.
The Augustine Gallery, Holt.
The Barnsdale Gallery, Yoxford, Suffolk.
Canning House, London.
Galeria Maldon.
Gainsborough's House, Suffolk.
The Guildhall, Thaxted.
Heffer's Gallery, Cambridge.
The Little Gallery, New Burlington Street, London.
The Rushmore Rooms, St Catharine's College, Cambridge.
The John Whibley Gallery, London.

Mixed

The London Group.
The Royal Portrait Society.
The Building Centre, Bond Street, London: Exhibition of Murals, 1938.
The Suffolk Art Society.
The Dunmow Art Group.
The New English Art Club.
The Contemporary Portrait Society.
The Phoenix Gallery, Lavenham.
The Wright Hepburn Webster Gallery, New York.
The National Society, London.
The Society of Graphic Fine Art, London.
The British Academy of Film and Television Arts, London.
The Lyttelton Theatre, London.
The Fry Art Gallery, Saffron Walden.
Royal Academy of Arts, Diploma Galleries, London: The Slade 1871-1971.
The Whitechapel Art Gallery: Mural and Decorative Painting, 1935.
The Tate Gallery: Mural Painting in Great Britain, 1939.

Collections

The Fry Art Gallery, Saffron Walden.
The Boundary Gallery, London.
The Harry Ransom Humanities Research Center, University of Austin, Texas.
The British Film Institute, London.
Bruce Denman Collection.
David Cohen Collection.
Robert Worley Collection.
Nicholas de Piro Collection.
Bill Connelly Collection.
The Victoria and Albert Museum Archive of Art and Design, London.
The Royal Air Force Museum Art Collection, London.
The Imperial War Museum, London.
The Slade School of Fine Art, London.
University College London Art Museum.

Record sleeves
Created for Argo Records (UK), 1954 - 1957Under Milk Wood, the BBC recording.Robert Still: Quintet for Three Flutes, Violin and Cello.Songs from Jamaica, recorded by Edric Connor.Songs from Trinidad, recorded by Edric Connor.The Legend of Sarah Bernhardt, recorded by Esme Percy.Constant Lambert.Songs from Mexico.Béla Bartók.Fauré.Sir Edward Elgar.Calypso, recorded by Edric Connor.Sir William Walton.Music by William Byrd.The Waste Land, by T. S. Eliot.The Beggar's Opera.

References

Further references
Bacon, C. W., Scratchboard Drawing, "Olga Lehmann", Studio Publications, 1951.
Branaghan, S., Chibnall, S, British Film Posters: An Illustrated History, British Film Institute, 2008, .
Fishenden, R. B., The Penrose Annual; Review of the Graphic Arts, "Olga Lehmann", Hastings House, 1953.
Foss, B., War Paint: Art, War, State and Identity in Britain 1939-1945, Yale University Press, 2007.
Harper, S., Women in Cinema, "Olga Lehmann", Continuum, 2000.
York, Malcolm, Edward Bawden and his Circle'', Woodbridge, Suffolk, Antique Collectors Club.

External links
British Film Institute|Olga Lehmann
Olga Lehmann BAC underground murals
Olga Lehmann: Bunker murals in Wiltshire
Monica Pidgeon Audiovisual world architecture site
Google Book Search, "Olga Lehmann"
Olga Lehmann's Argo album covers

Boundary Gallery Olga Lehmann works

1912 births
2001 deaths
English costume designers
English illustrators
English muralists
British production designers
English women painters
Chilean emigrants to the United Kingdom
Alumni of the Slade School of Fine Art
20th-century British painters
20th-century British women artists
Women muralists
Chilean people of German descent
Chilean people of French descent
Chilean people of Scottish descent
English people of Scottish descent
English people of French descent
English people of German descent
People from San Felipe de Aconcagua Province
Women production designers
20th-century English women
20th-century English people